Breukelen is a town and former municipality in the Netherlands, in the province of Utrecht. It is situated to the northwest of Utrecht, along the river Vecht and close to the lakes of the Loosdrechtse Plassen, an area of natural and tourist interest. It is located in an area called the Vechtstreek.
It is the namesake of the borough of Brooklyn in New York City, United States.

History
During the 17th century, many wealthy Amsterdam merchant families built their mansions along the river Vecht. In the Disaster Year (1672) the village and no less than 8 castles and mansions near Breukelen were severely damaged by warfare. Most of them were burned down by the French.

On January 1, 2011, Breukelen merged with Loenen and Maarssen to form Stichtse Vecht.

The New York City borough of Brooklyn in the United States is named after Breukelen (see History of Brooklyn).

Nyenrode Business University
The town is most well known for the being where Nyenrode Business University is located. Founded in 1946, Nyenrode is a university that offers business and finance-related higher education.

Transportation
 Breukelen railway station
 Bus services 120, 130, 143, 524 and 526

Population centres 
The former municipality of Breukelen consisted of the following villages: Breukelen, Kockengen, and Nieuwer-Ter-Aa.

Gallery

See also
 Film actor Rutger Hauer, who was born in Breukelen.

References 

 Statistics are taken from the SDU Staatscourant

Municipalities of the Netherlands disestablished in 2011
Populated places in Utrecht (province)
Former municipalities of Utrecht (province)
Stichtse Vecht